Gustav Betzén (14 January 1886 – 13 November 1978) was a Swedish athlete. He competed in the men's long jump at the 1912 Summer Olympics.

References

1886 births
1978 deaths
Athletes (track and field) at the 1912 Summer Olympics
Swedish male long jumpers
Olympic athletes of Sweden
Place of birth missing
20th-century Swedish people